Madison Kyle Bumgarner (born August 1, 1989), commonly known by his nickname, "MadBum", is an American professional baseball pitcher for the Arizona Diamondbacks of Major League Baseball (MLB). Previously, he pitched for the San Francisco Giants (2009–19). Bumgarner has won three World Series championships and two Silver Slugger Awards (2014, 2015). He has also been selected to four National League (NL) All-Star teams and has the most strikeouts in franchise history by a Giants left-handed pitcher.

Bumgarner played high school baseball at South Caldwell High School in Hudson, North Carolina, where he helped his team win the 2007 4A State Championship. After graduating, he was selected with the tenth overall pick in the 2007 MLB draft by the San Francisco Giants. He and Buster Posey both made their Major League debuts in 2009 and established a reputation as one of the best batteries in recent MLB history. Bumgarner pitched eight scoreless innings in Game 4 of the 2010 World Series, helping win the franchise's first World Series in San Francisco and the first since 1954. Two years later, Bumgarner pitched seven more scoreless innings in Game 2 of the 2012 World Series. In 2014, Bumgarner started the Wild Card game for the Giants, throwing a shutout against the Pittsburgh Pirates. He set the World Series record for the lowest earned run average (ERA) in 2014, taking home the Most Valuable Player award as the Giants won their third World Series during his time in San Francisco.

In 2015 and 2016, Bumgarner reached his third and fourth All-Star Games, though the 2015 game is the only one he pitched in during his time with the Giants. He won 18 games (his career-high) in 2014 and 2015, and he had a 15–9 record in 2016, along with a career-high 251 strikeouts. Bumgarner started his second Wild Card game against the New York Mets, again throwing a shutout. Injuries interrupted the first half of his next two seasons, a dirt bike accident in 2017 and a broken finger in 2018. Bumgarner led the NL in games started in 2019, posting a 9–9 record. A free agent after the year, he signed a five-year, $85 million contract with the Diamondbacks.

Early life
Bumgarner was born August 1, 1989, in Hickory, North Carolina, and grew up in an area ten miles away nicknamed "Bumtown" because of the abundance of people with the surname Bumgarner who have lived there over the years after their ancestors had arrived from Germany. He grew up in a log house built by his father, sleeping in a loft. At the age of four, he began playing youth baseball league, for which his father had to sign a waiver because the league was for five- to eight-year-olds. He would not let Madison throw curveballs until he was sixteen. His parents, Kevin and Debbie, divorced while Bumgarner was in high school.

Bumgarner attended South Caldwell High School in Hudson, North Carolina, where he was known as "Maddie" and played on both the school's baseball team and the Post 29's American Legion Baseball team. In his junior season, he had a 12–2 win–loss record, an 0.99 earned run average (ERA), and 120 strikeouts in 84 innings pitched as he led his team to a runner-up in the 2006 4A State Championship. The next season, he went 11–2 with a 1.05 ERA and 143 strikeouts in 86 innings while his team won the state championship. He hit .424 with 11 home runs and 38 runs batted in (RBIs). He was named most valuable player (MVP) of the playoffs and the Gatorade North Carolina Player of the Year, garnering the nickname "The Carolina Peach." Bumgarner attracted so much attention from scouts and agents in high school that his father built a wall around the bullpen at his high school field to keep them from distracting him as he warmed up. He committed to attend the University of North Carolina at Chapel Hill on a college baseball scholarship.

In 2013, the North Carolina High School Athletic Association included him on its "100 To Remember" male athletes list, which included Michael Jordan, Carl Eller, and Jim Beatty.

Professional career

Draft and minor leagues
The San Francisco Giants selected Bumgarner in the first round, with the tenth overall selection, of the 2007 MLB draft. Going into the draft, Baseball America had ranked him as the 14th-best prospect overall. He was the first high school pitcher to be selected as the Giants' first pick since Matt Cain in 2002, and the first left-handed pitcher selected in the first round by the organization since Noah Lowry in 2001.

Bumgarner pitched for the Augusta Greenjackets, the Giants' Low-A South Atlantic League affiliate, in 2008. The Giants had him alter the angle of his head during delivery, but after Bumgarner struggled over his first three starts in Augusta, he reverted to the way he had thrown in high school. With Augusta, he worked on his changeup, slider, and ability to throw effectively on the inside part of the plate, a critical trait for a pitcher with his side-armed delivery. He won the South Atlantic League pitchers' Triple Crown, tying for the league lead in wins (15, tied with Levi Maxwell), leading the league in ERA (1.46), and leading the league in strikeouts (164). He began the 2009 season with the Giants' High-A affiliate, the San Jose Giants of the California League. After five starts, in which he went 3–1 with a 1.48 ERA and 23 strikeouts, he was called up to the Giants AA affiliate, the Connecticut Defenders of the Eastern League. On July 22, he hit a grand slam against Eric Niesen and picked up the victory in a 9–3 triumph over the Binghamton Mets. In 20 games (19 starts) with them, he went 9–1 with a 1.93 ERA and 69 strikeouts.

In 2008, Baseball America ranked him the third-best prospect in the Giants organization. Before the start of the 2009 season, the magazine ranked Bumgarner as the ninth-best prospect in baseball. Entering 2010, Bumgarner attended the Giants' spring training before the season, competing for the position of fifth starter. He dropped to the fourteenth-best prospect in baseball on the magazine's list, as some writers were concerned about a drop in Bumgarner's velocity. Out of shape entering the new season, he struggled and was sent down to the AAA Fresno Grizzlies, partly due to his loss of velocity. In 14 starts with Fresno, he went 7–1 with a 3.16 ERA and 59 strikeouts.

San Francisco Giants (2009–2019)

2009
The Giants promoted Bumgarner to the major leagues for his debut in a start against the San Diego Padres on September 8, 2009. He started in place of ace Tim Lincecum, who was scratched with back spasms. At the age of twenty and thirty-eight days, he became the second-youngest pitcher ever to start a game for the Giants, older only than Mike McCormick, who started two games for the Giants—as a nineteen-year-old—in 1956, when the team was still in New York. In the bottom of the third inning with no outs, Bumgarner struck out Padres' pitcher Kevin Correia for his first career strikeout. Bumgarner made four appearances with the Giants in 2009, posting an ERA of 1.80, striking out ten batters, and pitching ten innings.

2010
On June 26, 2010, Bumgarner was called up again to join the club, facing the Boston Red Sox the next day, where he registered his first career major league hit. He replaced Joe Martinez, who had made one start in place of an injured Todd Wellemeyer, in the starting rotation. The next day, Bumgarner made his first career major league pinch-hitting appearance. On July 6, Bumgarner earned his first career major league victory by going eight innings without yielding a run. In the game, he also registered his first career major league run batted in (RBI). Bumgarner pitched well enough that when Wellemeyer returned from the disabled list in August, Giants' manager Bruce Bochy chose to use him in the bullpen and leave Bumgarner in the rotation.

In five September starts during the Giants' successful run to the National League West Division championship, Bumgarner posted an ERA of 1.13. At the end of September, Bumgarner earned his first win at home, making him 7–6 on the season. After the season, he was named a starting pitcher on Baseball Americas 2010 All-Rookie Team.

Bumgarner made his postseason debut in Game 4 of the 2010 National League Division Series (NLDS) against the Atlanta Braves, and by pitching six innings advanced the Giants to the 2010 National League Championship Series (NLCS), becoming the youngest pitcher in Giants' franchise history to appear in, start, and win a playoff game. He was also the sixth-youngest pitcher to appear in a playoff game. In Game 6 of the NLCS, Bumgarner pitched two shutout relief innings against the Philadelphia Phillies as the Giants advanced to the 2010 World Series. In Game 4 of the World Series against the Texas Rangers, Bumgarner pitched eight shutout innings, allowing only three hits and permitting just one Ranger to reach second base, in the process of recording his first career World Series win. He became the fifth-youngest pitcher to start a World Series game. This win gave the Giants a 3–1 lead in the series, en route to the Giants winning their first World Series championship since the 1954 World Series—and their first title in the 52-year history of the San Francisco era.

2011

On April 11 at AT&T Park, against the Los Angeles Dodgers, Bumgarner got former teammate Juan Uribe to strikeout swinging in the top of the second inning for his 100th career strikeout. Bumgarner was 0–5 with a 4.58 ERA in his first seven starts of the 2011 season. Despite pitching at least six innings and giving up more than one earned run only once in his five starts from April 27 through May 19, 2011, it was not until the 19th that he got his first win, collecting an ERA of 3.71 for the season at that point. On May 19, 2011, at Dodger Stadium, in a 3–1 win over the Los Angeles Dodgers, Bumgarner pitched with the worst era with it being a 35.3 ERA 2009 All-Star Dodger pitcher Chad Billingsley. He threw a career-high 89 strikes on the outing. By June 9, Bumgarner had a 1.93 ERA over his last nine starts, yet had two wins and five losses to show for it. In seven of his eight losses at that point, the Giants either only scored once or scored no times at all.

On September 5, Bumgarner struck out thirteen batters while yielding two earned runs, seven hits and one walk over  innings while earning the win against the Padres. It was his second consecutive double digit strikeout game, having struck out eleven Cubs batters in his previous start against the Chicago Cubs. With his win September 16, Bumgarner won five consecutive starts; he finished the season 13–13 with a 3.21 ERA, 204 innings pitched, and 191 strikeouts. Bumgarner was 12–1 for the games in which his teammates scored three or more runs. Bumgarner finished eleventh in voting for the NL Cy Young Award.

2012
On April 17, 2012, Bumgarner and the Giants agreed to a six-year contract extension worth $35.56 million through the 2017 season. The contract includes additional $12 million options for 2018 and 2019. Bumgarner began the season by going 5–1 with a 2.31 ERA. On June 12 at AT&T Park (the Giants' home stadium), in a 6–3 win over the Houston Astros, Bumgarner hit his first major league home run and also struck out twelve batters. On June 28 at AT&T Park, in a 5–0 win over the Cincinnati Reds, Bumgarner pitched both his first career regular-season complete game and regular-season shutout. With this victory, it marked the first time in franchise history with four straight shutouts and established a new San Francisco record of thirty-six consecutive scoreless innings. He finished the year with a 16–7 record while posting a 3.37 ERA and striking out 191 batters in  innings.

Bumgarner started Game 2 of the NLDS against the Cincinnati Reds, allowing four runs in  innings as the Giants lost 9–0. The loss put the Giants down two games to none in a best-of-five series, but they defeated the Reds by winning the next three. In Game 1 of the NLCS against the St. Louis Cardinals, Bumgarner lost again when he allowed six runs in  innings pitched in a 6–4 defeat. Though the series went the full seven games, he made no further appearances in it, but the Giants defeated the Cardinals four games to three. On October 25 at AT&T Park, in a 2–0 win over the American League (AL) champion Detroit Tigers in Game 2 of the World Series, Bumgarner pitched seven scoreless innings, striking out eight batters and yielding only two hits. The Giants swept the Series for their second title in three seasons.

2013

In his first start of 2013 on April 2, Bumgarner threw eight shutout innings against the Dodgers and added an RBI in a 2–0 victory. On April 19 at AT&T Park, Bumgarner got Yonder Alonso to strikeout swinging in the top of the fourth inning for his 500th career strikeout. Against the Braves on May 11, he had a season-high 11 strikeouts, picking up the win in a 10–1 victory. Bumgarner was selected to represent the National League for the 2013 Major League Baseball All-Star Game, his first career All-Star selection. Though on the roster, he was not used in the NL's 3–0 loss to the AL. On July 27, he held the Cubs scoreless for eight innings but received a no-decision in a 1–0 loss. He matched his season-high in strikeouts with 11 on August 2 in a 4–1 victory over the Tampa Bay Rays.

Bumgarner set career bests for ERA (2.77), walks plus hits per inning pitched (WHIP) (1.03) and strikeouts (199) in 31 starts, finishing with a 13–9 record. He threw over two hundred innings for the third consecutive season and improved at holding runners on base, conceding eight stolen bases in 2013 as opposed to 27 in 2012. Bumgarner finished in ninth place in voting for the NL Cy Young Award.

2014
For the first time in his career in 2014, Bumgarner started for the Giants on Opening Day. On April 11, Bumgarner hit his first career grand slam and registered a career-high five RBIs. Bumgarner was named NL Pitcher of the Month for May after going 5–0 in six starts, with 48 strikeouts and a 2.08 ERA.

Bumgarner represented the National League at the 2014 Major League Baseball All-Star Game, his second straight All-Star selection. However, Bumgarner was unavailable to pitch on July 15 in the All-Star Game because he pitched two days prior to the event. On July 13, in an 8–4 win over the Arizona Diamondbacks at AT&T Park, Bumgarner and Posey each hit grand slams, marking the first-ever occurrence in MLB history that batterymates each hit grand slams in the same game. Bumgarner also tied the all-time MLB records for grand slams in a career and in a single season by a pitcher with two. Tony Cloninger had been the last pitcher to hit two grand slams in one season, doing so in one game on July 3, 1966.

On August 26, Bumgarner pitched his second career complete game one-hit shutout, which included pitching seven perfect innings to start the game. In the process, he set a franchise-record sixth career game with ten or more strikeouts and no walks. Bumgarner was named the NL Pitcher of the Month for August. He went 4–1 with a 1.57 ERA, threw three complete games, and had 56 strikeouts against just three walks. On September 12, Bumgarner became the fifth left-handed pitcher in franchise history to strikeout over two hundred batters. His 207th strikeout of the season broke Ray Sadecki's mark, setting a new San Francisco Giants single-season strikeout record by a left-handed pitcher.

Bumgarner set a career high in wins with 18, posting an 18–10 record, a 2.98 ERA, and 219 strikeouts for the 2014 MLB regular season. Bumgarner fourth in voting for the NL Cy Young Award, behind Clayton Kershaw, Johnny Cueto, and Adam Wainwright.

The Giants reached the postseason for the third time in Bumgarner's career, this time as a wild card team. In the NL Wild Card Game against the Pittsburgh Pirates, Bumgarner pitched a four-hit shutout, his first career postseason shutout, allowing the Giants to advance to the NLDS against the Washington Nationals. He joins Sandy Koufax from the 1965 World Series and Justin Verlander from the 2012 ALDS as the only pitchers to pitch a shutout and strike out ten or more batters in a winner-take-all game. Used in Game 3 of the NLDS, he gave up three runs (two earned) in seven innings but suffered the loss in a 4–1 defeat. The loss was the only one for the Giants in the series, as they defeated the Nationals in Game 4 to advance to the NLCS against the Cardinals. Bumgarner threw  shutout innings in Game 1 of the NLCS, setting a major league postseason record with  consecutive postseason scoreless innings on the road, breaking the ninety-year-old record held by fellow Giant, Art Nehf. In Game 5, he limited the Cardinals to three runs in eight innings but left with the game tied. However, Travis Ishikawa hit a walk-off home run in the ninth to win the game 6–3 and clinch the Giants' five-game victory over the Cardinals. Bumgarner was named the NLCS MVP.

In the 2014 World Series, the Giants faced the Kansas City Royals. Bumgarner started Game 1, allowing one run in seven innings, ending his consecutive scoreless innings on the road streak at  innings. He earned the win in the Giants' 7–1 triumph. In Game 5, Bumgarner pitched his second career postseason complete-game shutout, another four-hit shutout, becoming the second pitcher in franchise history with two shutouts in a single postseason after Mathewson's three shutouts in the 1905 World Series and the first San Francisco Giants pitcher to throw a complete-game shutout in a World Series game since Jack Sanford in the 1962 World Series. He set all-time MLB records for lowest World Series ERA (0.29) among pitchers of at least twenty-five innings pitched and three starts, and was the first pitcher in World Series history to pitch a shutout with at least eight strikeouts and no walks. On October 29, in Game 7 of the World Series against the Kansas City Royals, on two days rest, Bumgarner pitched five scoreless innings in relief, preserving a one-run lead and earning the save as the Giants won their third title in five seasons.

Bumgarner was named the 2014 World Series MVP, finishing the series with a 2–0 record and an 0.43 ERA. In three pitching appearances, Bumgarner gave up one run in 21 World Series innings and pitched  total innings in the postseason. Following the postseason, he won the Babe Ruth Award as the postseason MVP and was named Sports Illustrated Sportsman of the Year and Associated Press Male Athlete of the Year.

2015

Bumgarner again started for the Giants on Opening Day in 2015 (April 6), holding the Arizona Diamondbacks to one run and earning the win in an eventual 5–4 victory. He pitched  scoreless innings and struck out six batters on May 4, 2015, in a 2–0 win over the Padres. He took a no-hitter into the seventh inning, but Justin Upton spoiled it with a leadoff single. On May 21, Bumgarner became the first pitcher to hit a home run off of Kershaw, who became the second Cy Young Award winner to surrender a home run to Bumgarner, joining Zack Greinke. Later in the year, on June 23, Bumgarner again pitched  innings against the Padres. This time, he struck out a career-high fourteen batters, tying Atlee Hammaker's franchise record for most strikeouts in a game by a left-handed pitcher. Five days later, in a 6–3 win over the Colorado Rockies, Bumgarner had two hits, one a solo home run, scored twice, and got Brandon Barnes to strikeout swinging in the top of the second inning for his 1,000th career strikeout. He became the third left-handed pitcher in the San Francisco era and the third-youngest in franchise history to reach the milestone. Only Amos Rusie (21) and Mathewson (25) were younger. For the third year in a row, Bumgarner was part of the NL All-Star team. This time, he got to pitch in the game, throwing a scoreless fourth inning with batterymate Posey catching him.

In a 3–1 win over the Astros on August 11, Bumgarner pitched a complete game. He struck out 12 Houston batters, including a career-high seven straight batters to tie a San Francisco record with Juan Marichal and Jonathan Sánchez. Meanwhile, he avoided walking any Astros. On August 16, he tied his career-high by recording 14 strikeouts, including three against Bryce Harper, who would go on to win the NL MVP award that year. Bumgarner also hit his tenth career home run and pitched a complete game shutout as the Giants beat the Nationals 5–0. He is one of two pitchers in the modern era along with Hall of Famer Early Wynn to hit a home run and strikeout 14 batters in a complete game shutout. He became the first Giants left-handed pitcher to record multiple fourteen-strikeout games in a single season and career, and joined Marichal as the only Giants pitchers in the San Francisco era to strike out ten or more batters, hit a home run, and record a shutout in the same game. For his exploits the week of August 9–15, Bumgarner won the National League Player of the Week Award. On August 18 at Busch Stadium, in a 2–0 win over the St. Louis Cardinals, Bumgarner logged his first career pinch-hit, a two-out single to left field in the top of the seventh inning off of Lance Lynn. He became the first Giants pitcher to record a hit in a pitch-hitting appearance since Kirk Rueter in 2004. On August 21 at PNC Park, in a 6–4 win over the Pittsburgh Pirates, Bumgarner hit his fifth home run, the most since Carlos Zambrano in 2006. On August 28 at AT&T Park, in a 9–1 win over the Chicago Cubs, Bumgarner struck out twelve batters through six innings, the third out of four games in which he finished with ten or more strikeouts.

On September 1, Bumgarner became the first left-handed pitcher in the live-ball era to hit five home runs and strikeout two hundred batters in a single season. On September 12 at AT&T Park, in an 8–0 win over the Padres, Bumgarner pitched his third career complete game one-hit shutout, including a career-high  perfect innings to start the game.

Bumgarner tied a career high in wins with eighteen, posting an 18–9 record, a 2.93 ERA, and also set career highs with a .667 win percentage,  innings pitched and 234 strikeouts for the 2015 MLB regular season. He was named the winner of the 2015 National League Silver Slugger Award at pitcher. Bumgarner finished in sixth place in voting for the NL Cy Young Award.

2016
For the third year in a row, Bumgarner made the Opening Day start for the Giants in 2016 (April 4), lasting only five innings and allowing three runs but earning the win in a 12–3 triumph over the Milwaukee Brewers. In his next start (April 9), Bumgarner hit another home run off of Kershaw, though the Giants lost the game to the Dodgers by a score of 3–2. From April 20 to June 20, Bumgarner allowed two earned runs or fewer in 12 consecutive starts, tying Fred Anderson for the third-longest streak in Giants history since 1913. In recognition of his hitting ability, the Giants used him instead of a designated hitter on June 30 at the Oakland Alameda Coliseum. That was the first time a pitcher batted for himself at the beginning of a game at an AL stadium since 1976, and only the fifth time since the creation of the designated hitter rule in 1973. He went 1-for-4 with a double.

For the fourth year in a row, Bumgarner was an All-Star, though he did not pitch in the game because he had made a start two days before. He limited the Diamondbacks to a single hit on July 10 in a 4–0 shutout, striking out 14. It was Bumgarner's fourth career one-hit game, the most by a Giants pitcher since Mathewson threw six. The game was a no-hitter until Jake Lamb got a hit with one out in the seventh. During Cain's 100th win on July 31, Bumgarner pinch-hit for Cain after Cain had thrown five no-hit innings. Bumgarner hit an opposite-field leadoff double, becoming the first Giants pitcher to record a pinch-hit double since Ray Sadecki did so in 1967. Teammate Jeff Samardzija (also a fellow starter) pinch-ran for Bumgarner and scored a run as the Giants beat the Nationals 3–1.

On August 18, in a 10–7 win over the New York Mets, Bumgarner became the second pitcher since 1900 after Hal Jeffcoat of the 1957 Cincinnati Redlegs to allow a grand slam and then hit a go-ahead home run in the same inning, according to the Elias Sports Bureau. Bumgarner surrendered a grand slam to future teammate Justin Ruggiano in the top of the fourth inning and proceeded to hit a two-run home run off of Jacob deGrom in the bottom of the fourth inning. In his next start, on August 23, Bumgarner struck out Rob Segedin for his 200th strikeout of the season, becoming the first left-handed pitcher in Giants franchise history to accomplish the feat for three straight seasons, and tying Mathewson for second all-time behind Rusie', Marichal's, and Lincecum's four.

Bumgarner faced defending NL Cy Young Award winner Jake Arrieta on September 3. He struck out ten batters and walked nobody in a 3–2 win over the eventual World Series Champion Chicago Cubs, notching his thirtieth career double-digit strikeout game, surpassing Mathewson's twenty-nine for second place in Giants franchise history behind only Lincecum's thirty-six. Against the Dodgers on September 20, Bumgarner had another 10-strikeout game with no walks. With his 240th strikeout of the season, he broke Cy Seymour's Giants' record for strikeouts in a single season by a left-handed pitcher, which had stood since 1898. Bumgarner picked up his one hundredth career win against the Dodgers on September 30, becoming the twenty-fourth Giant to reach the mark. He became the third Giant of the year to win his one hundredth career game on the 2016 season, joining Cueto and Cain. In 34 starts (which led the league), Bumgarner had a 15–9 record, a 2.74 ERA, and 251 strikeouts in  innings. His 251 strikeouts ranked third in the league, behind Scherzer's 284 and José Fernández's 253; his 2.74 ERA was fourth, behind Kyle Hendricks's 2.13, Jon Lester's 2.44, and Noah Syndergaard's 2.60. Bumgarner was fourth place in voting for the NL Cy Young Award (behind Max Scherzer, Lester, and Hendricks); he finished sixteenth in NL MVP voting and was second to Scherzer among pitchers in voting.

The Giants had baseball's best record in the first half of the season, but they were baseball's fourth-worst team in the second-half. However, they still earned a spot in the NL Wild Card Game, which Bumgarner started on October 5. He pitched his third career postseason complete game four-hit shutout to give the Giants a 3–0 win over the defending National League Champion New York Mets. In Game 3 of the NLDS against the Cubs, Bumgarner faced Arrieta again. He gave up three runs in five innings and left with the Giants trailing 3–2, but the Giants rallied to win 6–5 in 13 innings. It was the only win for the Giants in the series.

2017
In his fourth consecutive Opening Day start on April 2, 2017, Bumgarner gave up three runs in seven innings and hit two home runs, including one against Greinke. He became the fourth Giants pitcher and the first in the San Francisco Era to hit a home run on Opening Day, joining Mickey Welch (May 1, 1884), Larry Benton (April 18, 1929), and Johnny Antonelli (April 17, 1956). The second home run made him the Giants' record-holder in home runs by a pitcher, pushing him past Hal Schumacher. Bumgarner also joined Carlos González and Joey Votto as the third player to hit multiple home runs off of both Kershaw and Greinke. However, the Giants lost 6–5 to the Diamondbacks. His season was abruptly interrupted by his first stint on the disabled list beginning April 21 after he suffered injuries to his throwing shoulder and ribs in a dirt bike accident. He was out for nearly three months with the injury, returning on July 20 against the Padres. Bumgarner received a no-decision in a 5–3 defeat. His first win of the year did not come until five days later, against the Pirates. With a 3–5 record on August 15, Bumgarner lost his next four decisions before winning his last game of the year to finish with a 4–9 record. In 17 starts, Bumgarner had a 3.32 ERA and 101 strikeouts in 111 innings pitched. After the season, the Giants exercised Bumgarner's 2018 contract option worth $12 million.

2018
As in 2017, Bumgarner missed much of the first half with an injury. This time, it was a broken finger suffered in spring training. The injury required surgery and kept him from pitching for the Giants until June 5. He picked up his first win of the year in his fourth start, a 3–0 win over the Padres on June 21. Six days later, in a 1–0 walk-off win over the Rockies, Bumgarner struck out leadoff hitter DJ LeMahieu for his 1,500th career strikeout, becoming the fourth-fastest left-handed pitcher since 1920 to reach the milestone. It was his 239th career game; Randy Johnson (206), Kershaw (218), and David Price (236) were the only ones since 1920 to reach 1,500 strikeouts quicker. From June 16 through  July 2, he threw 22 straight scoreless innings. Bumgarner picked up his 106th career win in a 13–8 win over the Cardinals on July 8, surpassing Rueter for the most wins by a left-handed pitcher in the San Francisco Era.

On August 23, in a 3–1 win over the Mets, Bumgarner won his 109th career game, surpassing Lincecum for sole possession of third place in the San Francisco Era and the most wins by a pitcher under Bruce Bochy's managerial career. He registered a pinch-hit walk-off RBI single off of Rowan Wick on September 25, knocking in Gorkys Hernández from third base in the bottom of the twelfth inning to give the Giants a 5–4 win over the Padres. It was Bumgarner's first career walk-off hit and the first by a Giants pitcher in twenty-eight years. Don Robinson was the last Giants pitcher to do so in 1990. In 21 starts, Bumgarner had a 6–7 record, a 3.26 ERA, and 109 strikeouts in  innings pitched. On October 29, the Giants exercised Bumgarner's 2019 contract option worth $12 million.

2019
With his fifth career Opening Day start on March 28, 2019, Bumgarner joined Marichal as the only pitchers to make at least five Opening Day starts for the San Francisco era Giants. He joined Carl Hubbell as the only left-handed pitchers in franchise history to reach 1,600 strikeouts, but the Giants lost 2–0 to the Padres. On June 15, he passed Hubbell's strikeout total in a game against the Brewers. Though he gave up five runs (three earned), the Giants won 8–7, with Bumgarner receiving a no-decision. He held the Rockies to two runs in six innings on June 25 and drove in the Giants' third run with an RBI single in a 4–2 victory. In an 8–4 win over the Cardinals on July 6, Bumgarner was removed after two innings due to being hit by a batted ball in the first inning. However, he had two strikeouts in the game, passing Lincecum's 1,704 to move into fourth place all-time by a Giant.

On August 8, Bumgarner became the first starting pitcher to have a hit and draw two or more walks at the plate while allowing one hit or fewer on the mound since 1920, according to STATS LLC. He also became the first pitcher ever to accomplish this feat while having more strikeouts pitching rather than batting. He made his 278th career start in a 3–2 win over the Oakland Athletics on August 13, surpassing Rueter (277) for the most by a left-handed pitcher in the San Francisco era and the second-most in franchise history behind Hubbell (433). In 34 starts (which led the NL), Bumgarner had a 9–9 record, a 3.90 ERA, and 203 strikeouts in  innings pitched. After the season, he became a free agent for the first time in his career.

Arizona Diamondbacks (2020–present)
On December 17, 2019, Bumgarner signed a five-year contract with the Arizona Diamondbacks, worth $85 million.

2020
On July 24, 2020, Bumgarner made his Diamondbacks debut as a Opening Day starting pitcher. He was placed on the disabled list on August 10, 2020. In his last outing, he touched 85-87 MPH against the Padres. In his first four starts for Arizona, he was 0–3 with 7 home runs allowed. Overall, Bumgarner struggled in his first season with Arizona, which was shortened due to the COVID-19 pandemic. He finished 1–4 with a 6.48 ERA in  innings.

2021
On April 25, 2021, Bumgarner pitched seven no-hit innings in the second game of a doubleheader against the Atlanta Braves. Because the game was only seven innings long, Bumgarner was not credited with a no-hitter. Bumgarner won the National League Player of the Week Award for the week of April 19–25. He finished 7–10 with a 4.67 ERA, striking out 124 batters in  innings pitched.

He was a finalist for the Silver Slugger Award, which was won by Max Fried.

2022
On June 22, 2022, at Petco Park, Bumgarner got Luke Voit to strikeout swinging in the bottom of the fourth inning for his 2,000 career strikeout. He became the eighth fastest left-handed pitcher in terms of innings pitched and the 86th pitcher in Major League history to reach the milestone. For the season, he was 7–15 with a 4.88 ERA, and gave up a major-league-leading 50 doubles in 158.2 innings.

Pitching style
Throwing a ball is the only thing Bumgarner does left-handed. Bumgarner has a unique pitching style; as he throws, it appears he is throwing toward first base. Bumgarner's repertoire consists of four pitches including a curveball he throws at two different speeds with two different types of movement. He features a four-seam fastball with an average velocity of 92.22 mph, a cutter that averages 87.77 mph, and a curveball that averages 77.45 mph with a sharp, mostly downward break. Occasionally, he throws a much slower curve with a more exaggerated and horizontal break that averages 70.25 mph, and he also throws a change-up that sits at an average of 84.51 mph. He tends to throw the fastball and the cutter over 30 percent of the time (exact percentage varies from year to year), and the change-up and curveball are his secondary pitches.

Career highlights
Bumgarner has hit 19 career home runs as a pitcher, which is the most by any active pitcher, and most hit by a pitcher, behind Carlos Zambrano, since the AL adopted the designated hitter rule in 1973.

Awards

Personal life

Bumgarner's parents are Kevin and Debbie. Kevin works nights at a food distribution company, while Debbie is an accountant for PepsiCo. Bumgarner has a stepsister and two older half-brothers. Bumgarner had a half-sister, Dena, who died in 2010 after accidentally overdosing on pain medication following hospitalization from cancer. Bumgarner has been a Baptist since his childhood. Andrew Baggarly, a reporter who covers the Giants, wrote of Bumgarner, "While I wouldn't describe him as outgoing, he struck me as being smart, well spoken and polite. He is deeply Christian and seems to be very grounded."

Bumgarner married his high school sweetheart, Ali Saunders, on February 14, 2010, in a private ceremony in which he wore "a white open-collar shirt and blue jeans while carrying a pocketknife." During the offseason, they live on a farm in North Carolina that is about thirty minutes from where he grew up in the old furniture manufacturing area of the state, and during the season in a condo in San Francisco. Bumgarner plays catch with his wife Ali, who grew up playing softball.

Appearances outside of baseball
Bumgarner has appeared on television as a guest on The Tonight Show Starring Jimmy Fallon. In episode 154 during season 1, he gave Jimmy Fallon MadBum underwear. Bumgarner has endorsement deals with Carhartt and Ford and has appeared in television commercials for both.

On February 23, 2020, Bumgarner revealed in an interview for The Athletic that he has competed in rodeo events as a team roper under the alias Mason Saunders, combining a shortened version of his first name with his wife's maiden name. He said that he had been roping since his mid-teens—long enough that "it's part of who you are"—and he has been discreetly competing in rodeos for some time, including during his MLB career. Bumgarner, who added that he was frequently recognized at rodeo events, won over $26,000 in a competition in Wickenburg, Arizona about two weeks before he signed his Diamondbacks contract, and said that he may pursue roping more seriously after the end of his MLB career.

MLB records

San Francisco Giants franchise records
 Most career postseason wins: 8
 Most wins by a pitcher in a single postseason: 4, 2014 (tied with Lincecum, 2010)
 Most career postseason strikeouts: 87
 Most strikeouts by a pitcher in a single postseason: 45, 2014
 Career Postseason Win Probability Added: 2.7 in  innings pitched
 Win Probability Added in a single postseason: 1.7 in  innings pitched, 2014
 Lowest career walks and hits per innings pitched in a single World Series: .476 in 21 innings pitched, 2014
 Most career strikeouts by a left-handed pitcher: 1,794
 Most strikeouts by a left-handed pitcher in a single season: 251 (2016)
 Most career wins by a left-handed pitcher in the San Francisco Era: 119

Regular season records
 Most grand slams hit by a pitcher in a single season: 2 in 2014 (tied with Tony Cloninger)
 Most career grand slams hit by a pitcher: 2 (tied with 6 others)
 Most home runs hit by a pitcher on Opening Day: 2 vs. Arizona Diamondbacks at Chase Field on April 2, 2017

Postseason records
 Most innings pitched in a single postseason: , 2014
 Most starts in a single postseason: 6, 2014 (tied with Curt Schilling, 2001, Chris Carpenter, 2011, Corey Kluber, 2016, and Justin Verlander, 2019)
 Most career postseason starts of at least 7 shutout innings: 6

World Series records
Lowest career World Series ERA (minimum 20 innings of work): 0.25 in 36 innings pitched
Highest career win–loss percentage: 1.000 in 36 innings pitched
Highest win–loss percentage in a single World Series: 1.000 in 21 innings pitched, 2014
Lowest career walks and hits per innings pitched: 0.528 in 36 innings pitched
Lowest career hits per nine innings pitched: 3.500 in 36 innings pitched
Fewest hits allowed in a single World Series by any pitcher with at least 20 innings pitched: 9 in 21 innings, 2014
Most shutout innings in relief in a World Series game 7: 5 (tie with Joe Page)
Longest save in a World Series game: 5 innings in Game 7, 2014
Longest save in a winner-take-all game: 5 innings in Game 7, 2014
Most World Series games won through age 25: 4
First MLB pitcher in a single World Series to earn at least two wins, throw a shutout and earn a save – in 2014
First MLB pitcher in a World Series to pitch a shutout with no walks and at least eight strikeouts – game 5 in 2014

See also

List of Major League Baseball all-time leaders in home runs by pitchers
List of Major League Baseball career strikeout leaders
List of Major League Baseball career WHIP leaders
List of Major League Baseball no-hitters
List of Major League Baseball record holders
List of San Francisco Giants Opening Day starting pitchers
List of San Francisco Giants team records
List of Silver Slugger Award winners at pitcher
List of World Series starting pitchers

References

Sources

External links

Madison Bumgarner 2007 Draft Report at MiLB.com

1989 births
Living people
American people of German descent
Arizona Diamondbacks players
Augusta GreenJackets players
Baseball players from North Carolina
Connecticut Defenders players
Fresno Grizzlies players
Major League Baseball pitchers
National League All-Stars
National League Championship Series MVPs
People from Hickory, North Carolina
Roping (rodeo)
San Francisco Giants players
San Jose Giants players
Silver Slugger Award winners
World Series Most Valuable Player Award winners